Ion Zlătaru (born 17 November 1927) was a Romanian boxer. He competed in the men's bantamweight event at the 1952 Summer Olympics. At the 1952 Summer Olympics, he defeated Antoine Martin of France, before losing to Helmuth von Gravenitz of South Africa.

References

External links

1927 births
Possibly living people
Romanian male boxers
Olympic boxers of Romania
Boxers at the 1952 Summer Olympics
Place of birth missing
Bantamweight boxers